Medic is an American medical drama television series that aired on NBC from September 13, 1954, to August 27, 1956. It was television's first doctor drama to focus attention on medical procedures.

Created by its principal writer James E. Moser, Medic tried to create realism (City Hospital and The Doctor had not) which would typify subsequent medical shows. Moser had previously written for the radio shows Dragnet and Dr. Kildare.

Synopsis
Medic episodes were introduced and narrated by Richard Boone, playing Dr. Konrad Styner who sometimes also appeared in the stories. Fifty-nine segments aired from September 1954 to November 1956.

The series was introduced each week by theme music written by Victor Young. Eventually, with lyrics added by Edward Heyman, the song became popular under the title "Blue Star."

Episodes

Home media
On November 15, 2011, Timeless Media Group released Medic- The Groundbreaking Hospital Series on DVD in Region 1 for the first time.  The 6-disc set features 44 of the 59 episodes of the series as these are the only episodes for which Timeless was able to obtain the rights. This is believed to be due to only 44 of the prints being salvageable.

Guest stars
Notable guest stars included:
 Claude Akins
 Charles Bronson
 Cindy Carol
 Lee J. Cobb
 Richard Crenna
 Bobby Driscoll
 Jean Engstrom (3 episodes - all in 1955)
 Beverly Garland
 Dennis Hopper (his acting debut)
 Lee Marvin
 Vera Miles
 Ainslie Pryor (2 episodes - both in 1956)
 Denver Pyle
 Dick Sargent
 Robert F. Simon
 Robert Vaughn
 Michael Winkelman

Awards and nominations

References

External links

Medic at CVTA with episode list

Medic at The Museum of Broadcast Communications

1950s American drama television series
1950s American medical television series
1954 American television series debuts
1956 American television series endings
Black-and-white American television shows
NBC original programming
Television series by Universal Television